Roystonea violacea is a species of palm which is endemic to the Maisí region of Guantánamo Province in eastern Cuba.

Description
Individuals have about 15 leaves with  petioles and  rachises; the leaves hang well horizontal. The  inflorescences bear violet male and female flowers.

References

Trees of Cuba
violacea
Endangered plants